Columbus High School (CHS) is a public high school in Columbus, Nebraska, United States. It is part of the Columbus Public Schools district.

History

1883–1899 
The first high school in Columbus came in 1883. The Williams High School was opened as the result of a $12,000 bond issue.

1899–1925 
Columbus quickly outgrew Williams High. A new facility was built in 1898 for approximately $24,000. The building was called one of the "finest public schools to date" in Nebraska. An addition was added in 1904, and it was used as the high school until 1925 when it became Columbus Junior High School. The building was demolished in the late 1950s.

1925–1958 
Kramer High School was built just west of the previous high school due to the extreme demand for more educational space. Officially dedicated in December 1925, Kramer High was named in honor of long-time school board president Carl Kramer, who had died in 1924. Additions came in 1951, 1961, 1965, and 1990.  Kramer High served Columbus through 1958 when it became Columbus Junior High School and then Columbus Middle School in 1986.

1958–2017 
A new Columbus High School opened in 1958. Constructed for around $1,500,000, the new Columbus High proved to be a much-needed way of modernizing Columbus. Columbus High was added onto in 1965, 1976, and 1988. A $17.6 million bond issue was passed in 2003 to renovate the high school. The renovation, which was completed in 2007, added several classrooms and an expansive media center. This building was later turned into Columbus Middle School following the 2017–18 school year after the high school moved into its new facility.

2017–present 
A new high school was constructed in 2017 with a bond that was approved in 2015. The new building has a state of the art STEM facility and many other things.

Athletics 
Columbus High School is a member of the Nebraska School Activities Association and competes in the Heartland Athletic Conference. The school mascot is the Discoverer.]

Notable alumni 
 Arnold Oehlrich, NFL player
 Cory Schlesinger, NFL player
 Evan Williams, computer programmer and Internet entrepreneur

References

External links 
 

Schools in Platte County, Nebraska
Public high schools in Nebraska
1883 establishments in Nebraska